is a Japanese professional ice hockey defenceman currently playing for the Oji Eagles of the Asia League.

Since 2009 (the beginning of his professional career), he plays for the Oji Eagles. He previously played at university level for the Toyo University. He also has played for the Japan national team (junior and senior levels) since the year 2006.

References

1986 births
Asian Games medalists in ice hockey
Asian Games silver medalists for Japan
Asian Games bronze medalists for Japan
Ice hockey players at the 2011 Asian Winter Games
Ice hockey players at the 2017 Asian Winter Games
Japanese ice hockey defencemen
Living people
Medalists at the 2011 Asian Winter Games
Medalists at the 2017 Asian Winter Games
Oji Eagles players
People from Kushiro, Hokkaido
20th-century Japanese people
21st-century Japanese people